Protorthodes antennata is a moth in the family Noctuidae first described by William Barnes and James Halliday McDunnough in 1912. It has a small distribution in North America, extending from central Arizona to northernmost Mexico.

The length of the forewings is 10–14 mm. The reniform spot on the forewings is not outlined like in other Protorthodes species. There is a series of tiny white dots that partially define the reniform spot, and a series of tiny yellow dots that form a partial outer border of the spot. Adults have been recorded on wing from mid-May to mid-June and in October.

References

Moths described in 1912
Hadeninae